Backusella dispersa is a species of zygote fungus in the order Mucorales. It was originally described in 1910 by Hagem as Mucor dispersus, but in 2020 it was combined by Andrew S. Urquhart and James K. Douch into the genus Backusella, making the new combination B. dispersa.

See also

References

External links
 

Mucoraceae
Fungi described in 1910